The 2011–12 Dnipro season was the club's 21st campaign in the Ukrainian Premier League, and their second season under manager Juande Ramos. The club finished the season in 4th place, whilst also reaching the Last 16 of the Ukrainian Cup and the play-off Round of the UEFA Europa League where they were eliminated by Fulham.

Current squad

On loan

Transfers

Summer

In:

 

Out:

Winter

In:

Out:

Competitions

Ukrainian Premier League

Results summary

Results by round

Results

League table

Ukrainian Cup

UEFA Europa League

Play-off round

Squad statistics

Appearances and goals

|-
|colspan="14"|Players who appeared for Dnipro who left the club during the season:

|}

Goal scorers

Disciplinary Record

Team kit
These are the 2011–12 Dnipro Dnipropetrovsk kits.

|
|
|

References

External links
Official website

Dnipro Dnipropetrovsk
FC Dnipro seasons
Dnipro